Moisés Kaufman (born November 21, 1963) is a Venezuelan theater director, filmmaker, playwright, founder of Tectonic Theater Project, based in New York City, and co-founder of Miami New Drama at the Colony Theatre. He was awarded the 2016 National Medal of Arts by President Barack Obama. He is best known for creating The Laramie Project (2000) with other members of Tectonic Theater Project. He has directed extensively on Broadway and Internationally, and is the author of numerous plays, including Gross Indecency: The Three Trials of Oscar Wilde and 33 Variations.

Born and raised in Caracas, Venezuela, he moved as a young man to New York City in 1987.

Biography
Kaufman is of Romanian-Jewish and Ukrainian-Jewish descent, and was born in Caracas, Venezuela. He is an alumnus of Venezuela's Universidad Metropolitana, where he began to study theatre. After immigrating to the United States, he went to college in New York and graduated from NYU.

In 2005 he described himself in an interview by saying, "I am Venezuelan, I am Jewish, I am gay, I live in New York. I am the sum of all my cultures. I couldn't write anything that didn't incorporate all that I am."

Kaufman was awarded a Guggenheim Fellowship in 2002, following the premiere of The Laramie Project, which was based on extensive interviews with residents and commentators in and around Wyoming who were involved with the aftermath of the murder of gay student Matthew Shepard.

He made his Broadway directing debut in the 2004 production of I Am My Own Wife by Doug Wright, for which he received a Tony Award nomination for Best Direction of a Play.

On September 22, 2016, Kaufman was awarded the National Medal of Arts and Humanities in a ceremony conducted by U.S. president Barack Obama. He is the first Venezuelan to receive the honor.

Awards 
 2016 National Medal of Arts given to him by President Barack Obama
 Obie Award - (Best Director) I AM MY OWN WIFE 
 Guggenheim Fellowship
 Tony Award Nomination (Best Director) I AM MY OWN WIFE
 Tony Award Nomination (Best Playwright) 33 VARIATIONS (with Jane Fonda) 
 National Board of Review Award for Outstanding Made for Television Movie - THE LARAMIE PROJECT FILM (HBO)
 Humanitas Prize 
 Emmy Nomination (Dest Director) The Laramie Project Film (HBO)
 Emmy Nomination (Best Screenwriter - with the Members of Tectonic Theater) THE LARAMIE PROJECT FILM (HBO)
 Golden Bear Award from the Berlin Film Festival THE LARAMIE PROJECT FILM (HBO)
 Steinberg/ATCA Best New Play Award—2008: 33 Variations
 Outer Critics Circle Award BEST DIRECTOR: GROSS INDECENCY: THE THREE TRIALS OF OSCAR WILDE.
 Lucille Lortel Award BEST DIRECTOR: GROSS INDECENCY: THE THREE TRIALS OF OSCAR WILDE.
 GLAAD Media Award
 Bay Area Theater Critics Circle Award GROSS INDECENCY: THE THREE TRIALS OF OSCAR WILDE
 Lambda Book Award
 Venezuela's Casa del Artista 
 American Library Association's LGBT Literature Award
 Matthew Shepard Foundation's "Making A Difference Award"
 Artistic Integrity Award from the Human Rights Campaign
 Carbonell Award
 Joe A. Callaway Award for excellence in directing, given by The Society of Stage Directors and Choreographers

Stage directing credits 
 Paradise Square (musical). (Berkeley Rep, Chicago, Broadway). 
 TORCH SONG (Broadway) Tony Nomination - Best Revival of a Play.
 THE HEIRESS - with Jessica Chastain (Broadway). 
 Bengal Tiger at the Baghdad Zoo starring Robin Williams.(Broadway) 
 Puss in Boots (El Gato con Botas)
 33 Variations starring Jane Fonda. (Broadway) 
 Macbeth (starring Liev Schreiber) for The Public Theater's Shakespeare in the Park
 Lady Windermere's Fan
 This Is How It Goes starring Ben Chaplin at the Donmar Warehouse. 
 Into The Woods
 Master Class (with Rita Moreno)
 One Arm by Tennessee Williams
 I Am My Own Wife (2004, his Broadway debut)
 The Laramie Project (2000)
 Gross Indecency: The Three Trials of Oscar Wilde
 Marlow's Eye
 The Nest
 Women in Beckett
 Machinal
 Coxinga
 The Nightingale
 The Heiress
 Torch Song Trilogy
 The Album: Here There are Blueberries at the Colony Theatre (in collaboration with Miami New Drama)

Film credits 
 The Laramie Project

Television credits 
 The L Word (2 episodes)

See also 

 List of gay, lesbian or bisexual people: K

References

External links
Interview: Moisés Kaufman, The Jewish Theatre
Tectonic Theater Project

Jewish dramatists and playwrights
Jewish theatre directors
American theatre directors
American people of Venezuelan-Jewish descent
American people of Romanian-Jewish descent
American people of Ukrainian-Jewish descent
Venezuelan Jews
Venezuelan people of Romanian-Jewish descent
Venezuelan people of Ukrainian-Jewish descent
People from Caracas
LGBT Jews
Venezuelan LGBT writers
1963 births
Living people
Lambda Literary Award for Drama winners
Stonewall Book Award winners
Venezuelan emigrants to the United States
Gay dramatists and playwrights
Male dramatists and playwrights
New York University alumni
Venezuelan dramatists and playwrights
United States National Medal of Arts recipients